Gregory John Mansour (born November 11, 1955, in Flint, Michigan) is an American Maronite prelate, who has served as the eparch (bishop) of the Maronite Eparchy of Saint Maron of Brooklyn, a diocese based in Brooklyn, New York, covering the Maronite Church in the eastern United States, since 2004.

Life
Gregory Mansour was ordained priest on 18 September 1982 to the Maronite Catholic Eparchy of Saint Maron of Brooklyn. After its split on February 19, 1994, he was incardinated into the newly established Maronite Catholic Eparchy of Our Lady of Lebanon of Los Angeles.

On 10 January 2004 Mansour was appointed to the office of the Eparchy of Brooklyn succeeding Bishop Stephen Youssef Doueihi who retired., being ordained eparch on March 2, 2004, by Maronite Patriarch of Antioch, Cardinal Nasrallah Boutros Sfeir, ruler of the Maronite Church and his co-consecrators were Roland Aboujaoudé, titular bishop of Arca in Phoenicia of the Maronites and Stephen Youssef Doueihi, emeritus bishop of the Eparchy of Brooklyn. On April 27, 2004, Mansour was installed as eparch of Brooklyn.

Bishop Mansour was appointed chairman of Catholic Relief Services' board of directors on 22 November 2016, succeeding Archbishop of Oklahoma City Paul S. Coakley in the position. Mansour had previously travelled to Lebanon and Jordan to review CRS efforts to help refugees of the Syrian Civil War, as well as El Salvador and Egypt on behalf of CRS.

On 7 April 2020, the Bishop announced that he was recovering from COVID-19 following exposure to a sick individual whom he had stopped to help in New York City during the COVID-19 pandemic.

See also

 Catholic Church hierarchy
 Catholic Church in the United States
 Historical list of the Catholic bishops of the United States
 List of Catholic bishops of the United States
 Lists of patriarchs, archbishops, and bishops
Maronite Catholic Eparchy of Our Lady of Lebanon of Los Angeles (in St. Louis, Mo.; covering the central and western U.S.)

References

External links

 Maronite Catholic Eparchy of Saint Maron of Brooklyn Official Site
 http://www.gcatholic.org/dioceses/diocese/zmar0.htm

Episcopal succession

21st-century Maronite Catholic bishops
American Maronites
American people of Lebanese descent
1955 births
Living people
People from Flint, Michigan
21st-century American clergy